The following is a list of chapters for the Japanese manga series, Space Brothers.

Volume list

Chapters not yet in volume format
These chapters have yet to be collected into a volume. They were serialized in issues of Weekly Morning from January to March 2023.
#395 
#396 
#397 
#398

Note

References

External links
Official Kodansha Space Brothers introduction 

Lists of manga volumes and chapters